The University Club Tower is a residential high-rise building in Tulsa, Oklahoma. The building rises 377 feet (115 m). It contains 32 floors, and was completed in 1966. The University Club Tower currently stands as the 8th-tallest building in the city, and the 15th-tallest building in the state of Oklahoma. It also currently stands as the tallest all-residential building in Tulsa and Oklahoma. The circular building, marked by unusual floorplans surrounding its central core, was the first major building in the United States to be designed using a computer.

See also
 List of tallest buildings in Tulsa
 Buildings of Tulsa

References

External links

Residential skyscrapers in Tulsa, Oklahoma
Apartment buildings in Oklahoma
Buildings and structures completed in 1966
Modernist architecture in Oklahoma
1966 establishments in Oklahoma